The Bolivian recurvebill (Syndactyla striatus) is a bird species in the family Furnariidae. It is endemic to Bolivia.

Its natural habitats are subtropical or tropical dry forests and subtropical or tropical moist montane forests. It is becoming rare due to habitat loss.

It was formerly classified as a vulnerable species by the IUCN. But new research has shown it to be not as rare as it was believed. Consequently, it is downlisted to near threatened status in 2008 and least concern in 2012.

Footnotes

References
 BirdLife International (BLI) (2008): 2008 IUCN Redlist status changes. Retrieved 2008-MAY-23.

Birds of Bolivia
Endemic birds of Bolivia
Syndactyla
Endemic fauna of Bolivia
Birds described in 1935
Taxonomy articles created by Polbot
Taxobox binomials not recognized by IUCN 

Overview